Adult education, distinct from child education, is a practice in which adults engage in systematic and sustained self-educating activities in order to gain new forms of knowledge, skills, attitudes, or values. It can mean any form of learning adults engage in beyond traditional schooling, encompassing basic literacy to personal fulfillment as a lifelong learner. and to ensure the fulfillment of an individual.

In particular, adult education reflects a specific philosophy about learning and teaching based on the assumption that adults can and want to learn, that they are able and willing to take responsibility for the learning, and that the learning itself should respond to their needs.

Driven by what one needs or wants to learn, the available opportunities, and the manner in which one learns, adult learning is affected by demographics, globalization and technology. The oldest man to enroll in primary school in Kenya is one Kimani Ng’ang’a Maruge who was an 84 year old from Kariobangi Nairobi.

The learning happens in many ways and in many contexts just as all adults' lives differ.
Adult learning can be in any of the three contexts, i.e.:

 Formal – Structured learning that typically takes place in an education or training institution, usually with a set curriculum and carries credentials;
 Non-formal – Learning that is organized by educational institutions but non credential. Non-formal learning opportunities may be provided in the workplace and through the activities of civil society organizations and groups;
 Informal education – Learning that goes on all the time, resulting  from daily life activities related to work, family, community or leisure (e.g. community baking class).

The World Bank's 2019 World Development Report on The Changing Nature of Work argues that adult learning is an important channel to help readjust workers' skills to fit in the future of work and suggests ways to improve its effectiveness.

Characteristics
Educating adults differs from educating children in several ways given that adults have accumulated knowledge and work experience which can add to the learning experience. Most adult education is voluntary, therefore, the participants are generally self-motivated, unless required to participate by an employer. The practice of adult education is referred to as andragogy to distinguish it from the traditional school-based education for children - pedagogy. Unlike children, adults are seen as more self-directed rather than relying on others for help.

Adults are mature and therefore have knowledge and have gained life experiences which provide them a foundation of learning. An adult's readiness to learn is linked to their need to have the information. Their orientation to learn is problem-centered rather than subject-centered. Their motivation to learn is internal.

Adults frequently apply their knowledge in a practical fashion to learn effectively. They must have a reasonable expectation that the knowledge they gain will help them further their goals. For example, during the 1990s, many adults, including mostly office workers, enrolled in computer training courses. These courses would teach basic use of the operating system or specific application software. Because the abstractions governing the user's interactions with a PC were so new, many people who had been working white-collar jobs for ten years or more eventually took such training courses, either at their own whim (to gain computer skills and thus earn higher pay) or at the behest of their managers.

The purpose of adult education in the form of college or university is distinct. In these institutions, the aim is typically related to personal growth and development as well as occupation and career preparedness. Adult education that focuses specifically on the workplace is often referred to as human resource development. Another goal might be to not only sustain the democratic society, but to even challenge and improve its social structure.

A common problem in adult education in the US is the lack of professional development opportunities for adult educators. Most adult educators come from other professions and are not well trained to deal with adult learning issues. Most of the positions available in this field are only part-time without any benefits or stability since they are usually funded by government grants that might last for only a couple of years.

However, in some countries, which contain the advanced systems of adult education, professional development is available through post-secondary institutions and provide professional development through their ministry of education or school boards and through nongovernmental organizations. In addition, there are programs about adult education for existing and aspiring practitioners offered, at various academic levels, by universities, colleges, and professional organizations.

Adult educators have long maintained commitments to racial justice and other forms of social justice struggle. which included extensive work at Freedom Schools during the Civil Rights Movement. Contemporary commitments to racial justice in Adult Education include initiatives in the workplace  and beyond

Objectives

The primary purpose of adult education is to provide a second chance for those who are poor in society or who have lost access to education for other reasons in order to achieve social justice and equal access to education. Therefore, adult education is often a social policy of the government. Continuing education can help adults maintain certifications, fulfill job requirements and stay up to date on new developments in their field. Also, the purpose of adult education can be vocational, social, recreational or for self-development. One of its goals may be to help adult learners satisfy their personal needs and achieve their professional goals. With the development of economy and the progress of society, the requirement of human quality has been raised. In the 1960s, the proposition of "lifelong education" was put forward, which led to the change of contemporary educational concepts. Therefore, its ultimate goal might be to achieve human fulfillment. The goal might also be to achieve an institution's needs. For example, this might include improving its operational effectiveness and productivity. A larger scale goal of adult education may be the growth of society by enabling its citizens to keep up with societal change and maintain good social order.

One fast-growing sector of adult education is English for Speakers of Other Languages (ESOL), also referred to as English as a Second Language (ESL) or English Language Learners (ELL).  These courses are key in assisting immigrants with not only the acquisition of the English language, but the acclimation process to the culture of the United States as well as other English speaking countries like Canada, Australia, and New Zealand.

Theories

Eduard C. Lindeman's theories

Eduard C. Lindeman was the first expert who gave a systematic account of adult education. In his theory of education, education is regarded as a lifelong process. He pointed out that due to the constant development and change of social life and the surrounding environment, knowledge, and information are in a cycle of constant transmission, supplement and update, which requires people to keep learning to adapt to the changes in the outside world. At the same time, he believes that adult learners should not only learn for the needs of work and survival, but also have the opportunity to enrich themselves. He insists that adult education is an inspiring life-changing tool. Adult education should not only help people improve their skills and abilities in work, but also guide people to find happiness outside work.

Otherwise, Lindeman also proposed that the most valuable resource for adult learners is the learner's experience. He believes that the purpose of adult education is to give meaning to all kinds of experience. Experience can enhance learners' autonomous learning and cognitive ability.

In addition, Lindeman believes that adult education is an important means of improving society. The basic function of adult education is to promote the physical and mental development of adult learners. He argues that adult education is a powerful tool for social activists. Through adult education, the personal code of conduct and cultural knowledge of adult learners should be improved to gradually improve the social atmosphere and order.

Andragogy 
The principles of andragogy flow directly from an understanding of the characteristics of adults as learners and can be recognized when we understand the characteristics of adults, and see the way those characteristics influence how adults learn best. Teachers who follow the principles of andragogy when choosing materials for training and when designing program delivery, find that their learners progress more quickly, and are more successful in reaching their goals.

Malcolm Knowles introduces andragogy as the central theory of adult learning in the 1970s, defining andragogy as “the art and science of helping adults learn. Knowles's andragogy theory helps adults use their experiences to create new learning from previous understandings. Knowles believes that preparation for learning is related to the relevance of learning to adult life, and that they bring an ever-expanding experience that can serve as a learning resource.

Andragogy proposes the following six main assumptions about adults as learners:

1) As a person matures, his or her self-concept moves from that of a dependent personality toward one of a self-directing human being；

2) An adult has rich experiences that accumulated through family responsibilities, work-related activities, and prior education；

3) The readiness of an adult to learn is closely connected to the developmental tasks of his or her social role；

4) As a person matures, he or she refers to immediacy application of knowledge rather than the future application of knowledge which used to have occurred in his or her childhood；

5) An adult is motivated to involve in any form of learning based on his or her internal drives rather than external ones；

6) Adults need to know why they need to learn something.

Further, Knowles suggests that these characteristics should be taken into consideration when designing programs for adults as well as facilitating their learning process.

Also, Knowles proposes a model of self-directed learning. In Knowles's view, self-directed learning is a process. Individuals will actively diagnose their learning needs, propose learning goals, select and implement appropriate learning strategies, and evaluate learning results. This learning model makes them think that they are the masters of learning, thus encouraging the confidence of adult learners to learn actively.

Challenges and motivating factors
Adults have many responsibilities that they must balance against the demands of learning. Because of these responsibilities, adults have barriers and challenges against participating in learning and continuing their education. The barriers can be classified into three groups including institutional, situational, and dispositional.

Some situational barriers include the lack of time balancing career and family demands, the higher cost of education, and transportation. Dispositional barriers include lack of confidence, embarrassment, and a fear of failure. Institutional barriers include challenges that the college provides in relation to admission, admission requirements, and financial aid requirements from the education facility. Other institutional barriers include the lack of evening and weekend hours from administrative offices such as financial aid, bursar, or academic advising. The lack of evening and weekend hours impedes these students from receiving the necessary information for their retention and academic success. Distance and/or online learning can also address some problems with adult education that cause these barriers.

Meanwhile, research illustrates that understanding the motivations and barriers of adult learners can increase their enrollment and retention.  Additional research shows that adult learners are more motivated in the classroom when they can clearly identify the application of their education to their professional or personal experiences. When instructors recognize their students’ characteristics, they can develop lessons that address both the strengths and the needs of each student. Adults that are motivated, have confidence, and positive self-esteem are more likely to develop into lifelong learners.

In fast-developing countries, the qualifications of adults fall far behind those of young people, and may no longer match the requirements of a developed economy. This implies strong potential demand for the education and training of adults. This demand needs to be met through flexible modes of study which are suitable for adults, avenues of access that recognize informal prior learning, and the supports necessary for adults with limited formal education to succeed in further study.

Characteristics of non-participating adults in education 
Previous research findings suggest that as adults get older, they are less likely to participate in AE (Adult Education). The International Adult Literacy Survey (IALS), nationally representative samples of adults aged 16–65 in 23 OECD countries, has found that older age groups had lower participation rates than younger age groups   Particularly, adults aged 16 to 25 were on average about three times more likely to participate than older adults aged 56 to 65.

Eurobarometer survey, national representative samples of adult aged 15 to 65 of European Union countries, also revealed that adults in the three youngest age groups examined (ages 15–24, ages 25–39, and ages 40–54) were more likely to participate in AE than age group of 55+. Moreover, the Eurobarometer survey shows that participation rate declined from younger to older adults. Participation rate of European countries was 59% for adults aged 15–24. The rate began to decline 38% for adults aged 25–39 and it also fell down to 31% for adults aged 40–54. Participation rate was 17% for adults above 55. Reason of why older adults' participation declined relates mainly to lack of promotion and support. When people get old, their chances to take promotion for any AE programs are reduced.

In many OECD and European countries, employers often support their workers to attend in AE programs since they consider that workers with higher-educated and skilled are crucial indicators of development for companies. Therefore, older adults cannot get promotions from their employers because of the gradual loss of seniority, learning ability and performance. Since older adults are rarely offered a promotion from their employers, and the cost would be an obstacle for participation, they are unable to take the courses even if they wanted to take part in programmes. Moreover, lack of motivation and unavailability of learning opportunities could be additional reasons of older adults' low-participation).

Findings of previous research are quite mixed when participation in AE comes to gender. According to the IALS, there is no a statistically significant difference between men and women in AE. However, the average participation rate of men was a bit higher than women. It was 38.7% for men and 37.9% for women. The Eurobarometer survey shows a similar result to the IALS data. Specifically the average participation of males was 35%; while, it was 30% for females. Women's low participation is mainly resulted from family burdens and lack of financial support. However, an opposite tendency can be observed in the US. A study based on National Household Education Survey [NCES] in 2001 revealed that although gender difference did not exist much, females were more likely to participate in AE than males in the US. The participation rate was 49% for women and 43% for men.

Educational attainment is determined as the most important factor in predicting participation in AE. It is known that those with higher levels of educational attainment participate more in AE programs.

The IALS showed that there was a clear relationship between previous educational attainment and participation in AE. The data found those with low educational background were less likely to participate in OECD countries. Specifically, the participation rate was 57.6% for adults who completed college or university education; while, it was 15.5% for adults who did not complete high school.

The Eurobarometer survey also showed that 87% of low-educated people belonged to the non-participant group. Reason of low or non-participation of the less-educated can be explained from perspectives of individual and employers. Individual point illustrated that low self-confidence regarding the learning, which mainly derived from previous bad educational experiences, could be a major obstacle for the less-educated. Apart from low self-confidence, those less-educated might not perceive their need of participation or might actually not have a need to participate. Yet, employers' view was apparent that they tended to support high-educated because they were more trainable than the low-educated. Therefore, the participation of the less-educated was low since they could not get promotions from their employers.

At last, adults who come from a better socio-economic background tend to participate more in AE programs. The OECD data showed that higher the parent' educational level could produce the higher participation rate. 
                                          
Summarizing above findings, people, those are young and men, with high levels of education, high-status of jobs are more likely to take part in any form of education and training. On the contrary, typical non-participants tend to be women, older, less educated, and coming from poor socio-economic backgrounds. In addition, less-skilled, unemployed, immigrants, language minorities, and rural residents are less likely to participate in AE programmes.

Deterring factors for participation in education 
Deterrents are characteristics that explain why adults respond in negative manners to participate in education and learning. 
Deterrents faced by adults are multifaceted, including both external and internal factors. However, cost and time have been remained as the most frequently reported deterrents. Large sampled (nationwide and international) surveys on barriers to participation such as a study of National Center for Education Statistics (NCES) of the US, IALS and Eurobarometer indicated that time and cost were the main deterrents for adults. Moreover, some empirical studies discovered time and cost as the most cited deterrents through studying various groups of adults. Cost includes tuition fee of a programme as well as extra expenditures for learning such as clothes, food, transportation and other school necessities (textbooks and stationaries). It is well known that adults less educated, low-skilled and unemployed are less likely to participate in education/learning. For the unemployed, it is obvious that cost can hinder their participation in education. And those lacking education and skills must be paid low salaries. In this way, cost could be the most influential deterrent. Even employed adults seem not wanting to invest money for a course, but they could attend if their employers supported them financially. For the time barrier, most adults involved in the above-mentioned studies reported that they could not participate in educational activities due to lack of time. Adults tended to say that they were busy with their daily routines. Apart from cost and time deterrents, family and job commitments are other most commonly cited deterrents. The large sampled surveys and empirical studies as mentioned earlier revealed that adults tended to report family and job responsibilities as deterrents and rated right after the cost and time deterrents. However, Milana suggested that busy workload and family responsibilities can be associated with the time barrier, otherwise time barrier itself is a vague concept. Adults feel they do not have time to learn because they are busy at work and home. Thus, the time barrier should be considered in line with family and job commitments. 
After above-mentioned deterrents, another mostly reported deterrent is irrelevant and inadequate supplies of trainings/activities. In other words, AE programs and courses do not always suit the needs of adult learners. It, therefore, is also important for educational planners to recognize that AE opportunities available may not always suit the learner's need.

Deterrents related to an individual's internal issues tend to be reported in lowest rate. For example, the IALS showed that the least deterrent was lack of self-confidence. Also, the Eurobarometer survey indicated that adults’ perception of being too old to learn was the least significant deterrent.

Moreover, perceived deterrents are differentiated into social groups. Johnstone and Rivera found that older adults faced more dispositional barriers such as low self-confidence and too late for being learners. Also, younger adults and women were more experienced with situational barriers such as cost and child care arrangements. Among the less educated, one's low-confidence regarding the learning ability could be the main deterrent.

Benefits
Adult education can have many benefits ranging from better health and personal well-being to greater social inclusion. It can also support the function of democratic systems and provide greater opportunities for finding new or better employment. Adult education has been shown to have a positive impact on the economy.

Adult education provides opportunities for personal growth, goal fulfillment & socialization. Chris McAllister's research of semi-structured interviews with older adult learners shows a motivation to communicate with people and to get out of the house to keep mentally active.  Researchers have documented the social aspects of older adult education.

Friendship was described as an important aspect of adult learning. The classroom is seen as a part of their social network. In recent studies, the friendships that are made between adults seem to have an increasing effect on their social structure as a whole.

The development of social networks and support was found to be a key motivation of adult learners. As editor of a book entitled Adult Education and Health, Leona English claims that including health education as part of adult education makes for a healthier community.

When surveying adult education programs in Japan, Nojima found that classes focusing on hobbies and very specific recreational activities were by far the most popular. The author noted that more time, money and resources needed to be in place so participants would be able to take advantage of these types of activities. Withnall explored the influences on later life learning in various parts in the U.K. Results were similar in that later in life education afforded these older adults opportunities to socialize.
Some experts claim that adult education has a long-term impact on the economy and that there is a correlation between innovation and learning at the workplace.

Monitoring

Global Reports on Adult Learning and Education (GRALE) 

Global Reports on Adult Learning and Education (GRALE) are a series of reports that monitor progress on Adult Learning and Education (ALE), promote action, identify trends in the field of ALE, and explore solutions to challenges. GRALE play a key role in meeting UNESCO's commitment to monitor and report on countries’ implementation of the Belém Framework for Action. This Framework was adopted by 144 UNESCO Member States at the Sixth International Conference on Adult Learning and Education (CONFINTEA VI), which was held in Belém, Brazil, in 2009. In the Belém Framework for Action, countries agreed to improve ALE across five areas of action: policy; governance; financing; participation, inclusion and equity; and quality.

Adult and youth literacy rate 
According to the most recent estimates, the global youth literacy rate is 91%, meaning 102 million youth lack basic literacy skills. In low-income countries, one in three young people still cannot read.

The adult literacy rate is 86%, which means 750 million adults lack basic literacy skills. There are 92 literate women for every 100 literate men globally, and in low-income countries, as few as 77 literate women for every 100 literate men. The literacy rate is expected to continue to grow steadily in countries in all income groups.

At the global level, the youth literacy rate is expected to reach 94% by 2030 and the adult literacy rate 90%. In low-income countries, less than 70% of adults and slightly more than 80% of youth aged 15 to 24 years are projected to have basic literacy skills by 2030.

See also

By geographic region
 

Adult education in the United Kingdom

Other information

Educators

Anna J. Cooper

Historical
Chautauqua

Organizations
 
, New York, U.S.

 
 UPCEA (University Professional and Continuing Education Association) - adult and online education non-profit association

Citations

Sources

External links

The Council for Adult and Experiential Learning (USA)
UNESCO Institute for Lifelong Learning (UIL)
National Center for the Study of Adult Learning and Literacy (NCSALL U.S.)
BBC Adult Learners resources

The Profession and Practice of Adult Education: An Introduction

 
Educational stages